Stanislav Anatolevich Dineykin (born 10 October 1973) is a Russian volleyball player who competed in the 1996 Summer Olympics and in the 2004 Summer Olympics.

He was born in Blagodarny, Stavropol Krai.

In 1996 he was part of the Russian team which finished fourth in the Olympic tournament. He played all eight matches.

Eight years later he won the bronze medal with the Russian team in the 2004 Olympic tournament. He played all eight matches again.

References

External links
 
 
 

1973 births
Living people
People from Stavropol Krai
Russian men's volleyball players
Olympic volleyball players of Russia
Volleyball players at the 1996 Summer Olympics
Volleyball players at the 2004 Summer Olympics
Olympic bronze medalists for Russia
Olympic medalists in volleyball
Medalists at the 2004 Summer Olympics
Sportspeople from Stavropol Krai
20th-century Russian people
21st-century Russian people